The 1935–36 National Football League was the 9th staging of the National Football League, a Gaelic football tournament for the Gaelic Athletic Association county teams of Ireland.

Mayo won the league for the third year in a row. There was no final, the league being decided on points.

Format 
This was the first NFL season not to be decided with a knockout final: the team with the most points were winners. This would not happen again until 2020, when the league finals were cancelled due to the COVID-19 pandemic.

Results

Table
Mayo finished first with 12 points from eight games. They had wins over Kildare, Louth, Laois, Galway, Tipperary and Cavan, and lost to Dublin and Meath.

Leinster Football League

League Stage

Play-Off

Final Table

References

National Football League
National Football League
National Football League (Ireland) seasons